Lightwater is a village in the Surrey Heath district of Surrey, England, about  southwest of central London. Immediately surrounding towns and villages include Bagshot, Deepcut, Windlesham, Camberley, and West End, Woking. It is bounded to the north-west by the M3 motorway and to the north-east by the "Lightwater Bypass" (A322). To the south-east it is bounded by the "Red Road" (B311), while to the south-west there are vehicle-testing tracks owned by the Ministry of Defence.

The village is adjacent to junction 3 of the M3 motorway. The nearest railway station is at Bagshot, on the line between Ascot and Aldershot. Lightwater is part of the civil parish of Windlesham, which has a population of 17,000 and also includes the neighbouring village of Bagshot.

History

Development
Prior to development, the natural vegetation was part of the Surrey heathland as seen in Bagshot and Chobham Common. The region has been inhabited since pre-historic times with tumuli in the heathland to the south of the village.

In modern times, Lightwater grew as a place with holiday homes in a chalet style for people living in London. Since 1960 it has grown rapidly, with housing estates proliferating in the area just north of Red Road and the military ranges around Greyspot.

Facilities
The town has full medical facilities and veterinary surgery, a library, pubs, a post office, a range of shops and a petrol station.

Transport
Despite Lightwater being larger in size, the nearest railway station is at Bagshot. This reflects the fact that Bagshot used to be a more important town as a staging post on journeys from London to Southampton and the West Country. Lightwater has grown in size as a dormitory settlement in recent times. In the adjacent 1890s map of the area, Bagshot is a notable town while Lightwater is noted as just a farm.

Lightwater Country Park 
The park has a view point, called High Curley, which gives views of about 250 degrees. From this point Bracknell, Ascot Racecourse, the London skyline and Bagshot Park can be seen to the west of the M3.

Sport
The local senior rugby club is Lightwater Rugby Club.

The largest local junior badminton club, Swifts, is accredited as a Badminton England Premier Club and is based at Lightwater Leisure Centre.

References

External links 

 Lightwater website
 Aerial photographs of Lightwater

Villages in Surrey
Surrey Heath